Thorlac Francis Samuel Turville-Petre (born 6 January 1944) is an English philologist who is Professor Emeritus and former head of the School of English at the University of Nottingham. He specializes in the study of Middle English literature.

Biography
Thomas Turville-Petre was born on 6 January 1944, the son of Gabriel and Joan Turville-Petre (née Blomfield), both of whom were prominent scholars of Old Norse studies at the University of Oxford. He attended Magdalen College School, Oxford, and gained his B.A., B.Litt. and M.A. from Jesus College, Oxford. He joined the faculty at the University of Nottingham as a lecturer in 1971, where he subsequently became Professor of Medieval English Literature. He headed the Medieval section of its School of English for several years. From 1997 to 2001, Turville-Petre headed the School of English at the University of Nottingham. Subjects taught by Turville-Petre at the University include Middle English literature. He has conducted important research on the Wollaton Manuscripts, Piers Plowman and other significant pieces of historical literature.

Turville-Petre formally retired from the University of Nottingham as Professor Emeritus on 31 August 2010, but has continued to teach there. He is the author of award-winning scholarly papers, major monographs, and a recipient of large grants from Research Councils. Medieval Alliterative Poetry (2010), a festschrift in honor of Turville-Petre, was published under the editorship of John A. Burrow and Hoyt N. Duggan.

Publications
 (With J. A. Burrow) 2021. A Book of Middle English 4th edn. Wiley Blackwell. 
 2019. Old Testament Citations in Pearl Journal of English and Germanic Philology. 118(3), 390-405
(With John A. Burrow) 2018. Piers Plowman: The B-Version Archetype (Bx) SEENET, Raleigh NC.
 2018. Description and Narrative in Middle English Alliterative Poetry Liverpool University Press.
 2018. Is Cheuelere Assigne an Alliterative Poem?. In: AD PUTTER and JUDITH JEFFERSON, eds., The Transmission of Medieval Romance D. S. Brewer.
 2017. 'Alliterative Revival', 'Alexander Romances', 'Wars of Alexander'. In: S. ECHARD and R. ROUSE, eds., The Encyclopedia of Medieval Literature in Britain. Wiley.
 2017. The Vocabulary of the Alliterative Morte Arthure. In: SIMON HOROBIN and ADITI NAFDE, eds., Pursuing Middle English Manuscripts and their Texts. Brepols. 43-61
 2017. A Visit to the Faroe Islands in 1942 by Gabriel Turville-Petre Fróðskaparrit. 64, 161-82
 2015. Poems from MS Harley 913: 'The Kildare Manuscript' Oxford University Press.
 (With Ralph Hanna) 2015. Medieval Manuscript Fragments at the Staffordshire Record Office The Library. 7th ser. 16, 405-28
 (With Ralph Hanna) 2014. The Text of the Alliterative Morte Arthure. In: SUSANNAH FEIN and MICHAEL JOHNSTON, eds., Robert Thornton and his Books York Medieval Press. 131-55
 (With John Burrow) 2014. The Piers Plowman Electronic Archive, Vol. 9: The B-Version Archetype: SEENET Series A.12 Available at: <http://piers.iath.virginia.edu/exist/piers/crit/main/B/Bx>
 2014. Proverbs in Middle English Alliterative Poetry. In: NICOLAS JACOBS and GERALD MORGAN, eds., 'Truthe is the beste' Peter Lang. 169-184
 2013. 'Alliterative Horses'. Journal of English and Germanic Philology. 112(2), 154-68
 2013. 'The B-Archetype of Piers Plowman as a Corpus for Metrical Analysis'.. In: MICHAEL CALABRESE and STEPHEN SHEPHERD, eds., Yee? Baw for Bokes: Essays on Medieval Manuscripts and Poetics. Marymount Institute Press. 17-30
 (With Robert Adams) 2013. 'The London Book-Trade and the Lost History of Piers Plowman'. Review of English Studies.
 2013. Editing Electronic Texts. In: VINCENT GILLESPIE and ANNE HUDSON, eds., Probable Truth: Editing Medieval Texts in the Twenty-First Century Brepols. 55-70
 2013. A Nottinghamshire Dispute: English Documents of 1438-42 Nottingham Medieval Studies. 57, 171-194
 (With J. A. Burrow)2012. 'Editing the B Archetype of Piers Plowman and the Relationship Between Alpha and Beta'. Yearbook of Langland Studies. 26, 98-119
 2010. 'The Gawain Poet: Places of the Imagination'. In: TREHARNE, E and WALKER, G, eds., The Oxford Handbook of Medieval English Literature. Oxford University Press. 594-608
 (Editor with R. Hannah) 2010. The Wollaton Medieval Manuscripts: Texts, Owners and Readers. Woodbridge : York Medieval Press.
 2010. 'The Gawain Poet: Places of the Imagination'.. In: TREHARNE, E AND WALKER, G, ed., The Oxford Handbook of Medieval English Literature Oxford University Press. 594-608
 2008. The Green Chapel. In: O. J. PADEL and DAVID N. PARSONS, eds., A Commodity of Good Names Shaun Tyas.
 2008. St Erkenwald and the Judicial Oath Notes and Queries. 55, 19-21
 (With H. N. Duggan and M. Calabrese) 2008. The Piers Plowman Electronic Archive Vol. 6: San Marino, Huntington Library Hm 128 (Hm, Hm2)
 2008. The Etymology of 'Road' Notes and Queries. 253, 405-06
 2008. Early Middle English. In: MOMMA, H and MATTO, M, eds., A Companion to the History of the English Language Wiley-Blackwell. xxxiii, 690 p.
 2007. Reading Middle English Literature. Oxford: Blackwell.
 2005. 'Political Lyrics'. In: DUNCAN, T.G., ed., A Companion to the Middle English Lyric. Woodbridge: D.S. Brewer. 171-88
 (With E. Eliason and H. N. Duggan) 2005. The Piers Plowman Electronic Archive: vol. 5: London, British Library MS Additional 35287 (M) [CD-ROM] At: Woodbridge: Boydell & Brewer
 (With J. Burrow) 2004. A Book of Middle English 3rd. Oxford: Blackwell.
 2003. Oxford, Bodleian Library, MS Digby 86: a Thirteenth-Century Commonplace Book in its Social Context. In: EALES, R. and TYAS, S., eds., Family and Dynasty in Late Medieval England Donington: Shaun Tyas. 56-66
 2002. Putting it Right: The Corrections of Huntington Library MS. Hm 128 and BL Additional MS. 35287 Yearbook of Langland Studies. 16, 41-66
 2001. Sir Adrian Fortescue and his copy of Piers Plowman Yearbook of Langland Studies. 14, 29-48
 (With H. N. Duggan) 2000. An Electronic Edition of the B-Text of Piers Plowman in Trinity College, Cambridge, MS B.15.17, The Piers Plowman Electronic Archive: Vol. 2 Ann Arbor: University of Michigan Press.
 1999. Poems by Chaucer in John Harpur's Psalter Studies in the Age of Chaucer: 0190–2407. 21, 301-14
 1998. The Earliest English Manorial Survey Speculum. 73(1), 58-79
 (With A. J. Minnis and C. C. Morse) 1997. Essays on Ricardian literature in honour of J.A. Burrow Oxford: Clarendon Press.
 1997. Image and Text: Medieval Manuscripts at the University of Nottingham Nottingham: University of Nottingham.
 'The Pearl-Poet in his Fayre Regioun'. In: MINNIS, A. J., MORSE, C. C. and TURVILLE-PETRE, T., eds., Essays on Ricardian Literature in Honour of J A Burrow Oxford: Clarendon Press. 276-294
 (With J. A. Burrow) 1996. A book of Middle English Oxford: Blackwell.
 1996. England the Nation: Language, Literature and National Identity, 1290-1340 Oxford: Clarendon Press.
 (With M. Tate and R. B. Tate) 1995. Two pilgrim itineraries of the later Middle Ages Santiago de Compostela: Xunta de Galicia.
 1989. Alliterative poetry of the later Middle Ages : an anthology London: Routledge.
 (With H. N. Duggan) 1989. The Wars of Alexander Oxford: Oxford University Press.
 1988. Politics and Poetry in the Early Fourteenth Century: the Case of Robert Manning's Chronicle Review of English Studies.
 (With M. Gelling) 1987. Studies in Honour of Kenneth Cameron
 1982. Anthology of Medieval Poems and Drama. In: FORD, B., ed., The New Pelican Guide to English Literature 1. 387-602
 1977. The alliterative revival Cambridge: D.S. Brewer.

References

Further reading

External links
 Thorlac Turville-Petre at the website of the University of Nottingham

1944 births
Academics of the University of Nottingham
Alumni of Jesus College, Oxford
Alumni of Magdalen College, Oxford
Anglo-Saxon studies scholars
Medievalists
English philologists
Living people